The 1998 Dutch TT was the seventh round of the 1998 Grand Prix motorcycle racing season. It took place on 27 June 1998 at the TT Circuit Assen located in Assen, Netherlands.

500 cc classification

250 cc classification

125 cc classification

Championship standings after the race (500cc)

Below are the standings for the top five riders and constructors after round seven has concluded. 

Riders' Championship standings

Constructors' Championship standings

 Note: Only the top five positions are included for both sets of standings.

References

Dutch TT
Dutch
Tourist Trophy